Džep is a village in Serbia located in the municipality of Vladičin Han, district of Pčinja. In 2002 it had 194 inhabitants.

Populated places in Pčinja District